Vezhdi Letif Rashidov (born 14 December 1951) is a Bulgarian duffer sculptor, GERB politician and was a Minister of Culture of Bulgaria (2009–2013; 2014–2017) and Speaker of the 48th National Assembly from 2022 to 2023.

Rashidov was born in Dimitrovgrad to ethnic Turkish parents; however, he moved to Haskovo with his parents at age two. His mother Kadrie Lyatifova, a singer of Bulgarian and Turkish folk songs, died in a car crash when he was in primary school. His father Lyatif Rashidov was a miner in Madan and so was his brother Ruzhdi who died at 36 of cancer. Until seventh grade, Rashidov lived and studied at an orphanage in Studen Kladenets near Kardzhali. Rashidov then studied mining electrics and mechanics in Madan. He graduated from the National Academy of Arts in Sofia in 1978. As a sculptor, Rashidov has authored statuettes for a number of prominent prizes, as well as many large-scale works.

Despite being an ethnic Turk, Rashidov as a prominent social figure has been an outspoken critic of the Movement for Rights and Freedoms. He participated in the 2009 Bulgarian parliamentary election as GERB's voting list leader and proportional candidate in Kardzhali Province and became the first non-Movement for Rights and Freedoms candidate in many years to be elected to parliament from that constituency. When GERB won the election and formed a government in 2009, Rashidov was the party's Minister of Culture.

In 2014, when GERB formed a coalition government, Rashidov was for the second time the party's Minister of Culture.

Rashidov is married and has a child. In 2001, he was briefly arrested for assaulting a policeman.

References

1951 births
Living people
Bulgarian sculptors
Bulgarian people of Turkish descent
People from Dimitrovgrad, Bulgaria
Government ministers of Bulgaria
Ministers of Culture of Bulgaria
20th-century Bulgarian male artists
21st-century Bulgarian male artists
20th-century sculptors
21st-century sculptors
21st-century Bulgarian politicians
Members of the National Assembly (Bulgaria)
Chairpersons of the National Assembly of Bulgaria